Economic potential is the potential of a region, nation, or corporation for economic development and growth. Typically, discussions of economic potential occur when available resources have not yet been tapped and fully developed or exploited, possibly because of missing infrastructure.

The Dictionary of Military and Associated Terms (2005) defines economic potential as 
"The total capacity of a nation to produce goods and services."

See also
 Productive capacity
 Potential output
 Production–possibility frontier
 Developing country
 Potential superpowers

External links
Economic Potential

Production economics